The 1960 Milwaukee Braves season was the eighth for the franchise in Milwaukee, and the 90th overall.  The Braves finished in second place in the NL with a record of 88–66, seven games behind the NL and World Series Champion Pittsburgh Pirates.

Offseason 
 October 13, 1959: Enos Slaughter was released by the Braves.
 October 13, 1959: Mickey Vernon was released by the Braves.
 October 24, 1959: Rico Carty was signed as an amateur free agent by the Braves.
 October 26, 1959: Stan Lopata was released by the Braves.
 November 30, 1959: 1959 rule 5 draft
Clay Dalrymple was drafted from the Braves by the Philadelphia Phillies.
Georges Maranda was drafted from the Braves by the San Francisco Giants.
 February 9, 1960: Stan Lopata was signed as a free agent by the Braves.
 March 1960: Jim Bolger was purchased by the Braves from the Philadelphia Phillies.

Managerial and coaching turnover

Pitching coach Whit Wyatt was Dressen's only 1960 holdover from Haney's coaching staff, with Billy Herman, John Fitzpatrick and George Susce all departing with Haney.

Regular season 
 April 17, 1960: Eddie Mathews hit the 300th home run of his career.

Season standings

Record vs. opponents

Notable transactions 
 May 17, 1960: Ray Boone was traded by the Braves to the Boston Red Sox for Ron Jackson.
 July 15, 1960: Al Heist was traded by the Braves to the Chicago Cubs for Earl Averill, Jr. and $30,000.
 August 13, 1960: Earl Averill, Jr. was traded by the Braves to the Chicago White Sox for Don Prohovich (minors) and $15,000.
 September 21, 1960: Elrod Hendricks was released by the Braves.

Roster

Player stats

Batting

Starters by position 
Note: Pos = Position; G = Games played; AB = At bats; H = Hits; Avg. = Batting average; HR = Home runs; RBI = Runs batted in

Other batters 
Note: G = Games played; AB = At bats; H = Hits; Avg. = Batting average; HR = Home runs; RBI = Runs batted in

Pitching

Starting pitchers 
Note: G = Games pitched; IP = Innings pitched; W = Wins; L = Losses; ERA = Earned run average; SO = Strikeouts

Other pitchers 
Note: G = Games pitched; IP = Innings pitched; W = Wins; L = Losses; ERA = Earned run average; SO = Strikeouts

Relief pitchers 
Note: G = Games pitched; W = Wins; L = Losses; SV = Saves; ERA = Earned run average; SO = Strikeouts

Farm system 

LEAGUE CHAMPIONS: Louisville, Yakima, Boise, Wellsville

Notes

References 

1960 Milwaukee Braves season at Baseball Reference

Milwaukee Braves seasons
Milwaukee Braves season
1960 in sports in Wisconsin